Marie Claire Barikukiye is a Burundian politician who is representative in the East African Legislative Assembly.

References

External links
EALA Profile

Burundian women in politics
Living people
Members of the East African Legislative Assembly
Year of birth missing (living people)
Place of birth missing (living people)